The term Windsor Grey is given to grey horses used by the Royalty of the United Kingdom to towing carriages in various ceremonial processions and, since 1986, when Elizabeth II was Trooping the Colour. They are stabled in the Royal Mews.  Some have also represented the crown in various carriage combined driving competitions, at times driven by Prince Philip, Duke of Edinburgh.

Two Windsor Grey horses, Claudia and Storm, at the Royal Mews in London are available for observation daily. Storm was featured in a statue with another of the type, Daniel. Storm and Tyrone, another Windsor Grey, pulled the procession carriage through Windsor for the Wedding of Prince Harry and Meghan Markle on 19 May 2018.

References
 Trooping the Colour
 The Horse article

Types of horse